The painted limestone bust of Ankhhaf is an ancient Egyptian sculpture dating from the Old Kingdom. It is considered the work "of a master" of ancient Egyptian art, and can be seen at the Museum of Fine Arts, Boston. Its catalog number is Museum Expedition 27.442.

Description
It depicts a mature man and was therefore likely made during the reign of Khafre (circa 2520–2494 BC).  One of the earliest – and even after four and a half thousand years, still among the finest – true sculptured portraits, it is an almost unprecedented depiction of the unidealised features of an actual man.  Sculptures portraying true likenesses of people (rather than highly stylized portrayals) are rare in Ancient Egyptian art, both before and after the creation of Ankhhaf's bust. Plaster covers a limestone core, which has been painted red, a colour commonly given to males in both sculpture and in reliefs (figures of women were typically painted yellow). The face is stern, with a slightly uneven mouth which makes him appear as though he is smirking from one side, and aloof and impersonal from the other. There is a slight droop to the eyelids, whose eyes were once painted white with brown pupils. The figure once had a beard and ears, which were broken away in antiquity along with part of the figure's nose.

Site of discovery
The bust was discovered in his tomb, installed within a small chapel oriented to the east and facing the chapel's doorway. His arms may have been sculpted on the small pedestal on which it sat, though these have been lost. It was evident that it had once been the focus of a funerary cult, as the bust had crushed several small pottery vessels of the type used for offerings when it fell in antiquity from its pedestal.

Method of discovery
The bust was discovered by a museum expedition funded jointly by the Museum of Fine Arts, Boston and Harvard University, and under the contract of the time, such a fine piece would normally have found a home at the Egyptian Museum in Cairo. However, this piece was awarded as thanks for the extensive work done by this expedition and the discovery of the intact royal tomb of Queen Hetepheres, who was Ankhhaf's aunt, a sister of his father. More recently, Zahi Hawass, the chief of Egypt's Supreme Council of Antiquities, has asked that this piece be repatriated to Egypt, as one of five key items belonging to Egypt's cultural heritage, a list which also includes the iconic bust of Nefertiti in the Egyptian Museum of Berlin, a statue of the Great Pyramid architect Hemiunu in the Roemer-und-Pelizaeus-Museum in Hildesheim, Germany, and the Dendara Temple Zodiac in the Louvre in Paris.

Gallery of images

References

26th-century BC works
25th-century BC works
3rd-millennium BC sculptures
Sculptures of ancient Egypt
Sculptures of the Museum of Fine Arts, Boston
Art and cultural repatriation
Sneferu
Limestone sculptures in the United States
Busts in Massachusetts
Egypt–United States relations

Cf. J. Assmann, Preservation and Presentation of Self in Ancient Egyptian Portraiture, in Studies in Honor of William Kelly Simpson Volume 1, pp. 55–81. Edited by Peter Der Manuelian. Boston: Department of Ancient Egyptian, Nubian, and Near Eastern Art, Museum of Fine Arts, Boston 1996.